Fatehpur Chaurasi is a town and a nagar panchayat in Unnao district  in the state of Uttar Pradesh, India. First officially classified as a town for the 1981 census, Fatehpur Chaurasi is located on the north bank of the Kalyani river, a bit to the south of the main road from Unnao to Bangarmau. Local industries include the production of furniture, boxes, almirahs, shoes, and slippers. As of 2011, the town's population is 6,715, in 1,158 households.

Demographics

According to the 2001 census, Fatehpur Chaurasi had a population of 5424. Males constitute 53% of the population and females 47%. Fatehpur Chaurasi has an average literacy rate of 52%, lower than the national average of 59.5%: male literacy is 60%, and female literacy is 44%. In Fatehpur Chaurasi, 17% of the population is under 6 years of age.

According to the 2011 census, Fatehpur Chaurasi has a population of 6,715 people, in 1,158 households. The town's sex ratio is 892 females to every 1000 males;  3,550 of Fatehpur Chaurasi's residents are male and 3,165 are female. Among the 0-6 age group, the sex ratio is 955, which is higher than the district urban average. Members of Scheduled Castes make up 7.3% of the town's population, while no members of scheduled tribes were recorded. The town's literacy rate was 70.1% (counting only people age 7 and up); literacy was higher among men and boys (78.6%) than among women and girls (60.4%).

In terms of employment, 18.0% of Fatehpur Chaurasi residents were classified as main workers (i.e. people employed for at least 6 months per year) in 2011. Marginal workers (i.e. people employed for less than 6 months per year) made up 10.4%, and the remaining 71.6% were non-workers. Employment status varied heavily according to gender, with 45.7% of men being either main or marginal workers, compared to only 9.0% of women.

Education
Fatehpur chaurasi has a Jawahar Navodaya Vidyalaya, where students of different parts of the district of unnao come to study

Office
Fatehpur chaurasi has a Sarkari Result Head Office , where students of different parts of the district of unnao come to get help

Villages 
Fatehpur Chaurasi CD block has the following 116 villages:

References

Cities and towns in Unnao district